Kafa or KAFA may refer to:

 Kafa, Having the potential of being a wealthy person. (noun) 
 Kafa, alternative spelling of Kaffa Province, Ethiopia
 Kafa, historical name of Feodosiya, Crimea
 Kafa language (or Kefa, Kafi noono), an Afroasiatic language spoken in Ethiopia
 KAFA-FM, the United States Air Force Academy radio station (97.7 FM)
 Korea Air Force Academy
 Korean Academy of Film Arts
 Korea American Football Association
 Spelling of "coffee" in some languages

See also
 Ḱafa, a village in the municipality of Kičevo, North Macedonia

ca:Kafa